The UConn Huskies women's basketball team, representing the University of Connecticut in NCAA Division I college basketball, has had 38 players selected in the Women's National Basketball Association (WNBA) Draft. Of these selections, 25 were in the first round of the draft; five players—Sue Bird in 2002, Diana Taurasi in 2004, Tina Charles in 2010, Maya Moore in 2011, and Breanna Stewart in 2016—were picked first overall.  At least one UConn women's basketball alumna was selected or allocated in every WNBA Draft from 2009 to 2020, with the 2021 draft being only the third in which no Huskies player was chosen.

Each WNBA franchise seeks to add new players through their respective annual draft.  The WNBA uses a draft lottery to determine the order of selection for the first picks of the draft; the teams that did not make the playoffs the previous year are eligible to participate.  After the first picks are decided, the remaining teams select in reverse order of their win–loss record.  The WNBA requires that players be at least 22 years old during the calendar year of the applicable seasons, have either graduated from a four-year university or have completed their intercollegiate basketball eligibility, or have played at least two seasons for another professional basketball league.

In addition to the 36 draftees, two UConn women's basketball players—Rebecca Lobo in 1997 and Nykesha Sales in 1999—were allocated to specific teams during the initial formation of the WNBA.  Lobo was assigned to the New York Liberty and is considered one of the WNBA's first players.  Sales was the first player for the expansion Orlando Miracle; the team would later relocate and become the Connecticut Sun.

UConn women's basketball alumni have had a significant impact on the WNBA. Six players—Taurasi, Charles, Moore, Stewart, Napheesa Collier, and Crystal Dangerfield—were named WNBA Rookie of the Year, and the first four named players were later named WNBA Most Valuable Player (MVP). Several other UConn alumni have been named to All-WNBA teams or selected as WNBA All-Stars on multiple occasions. Nine UConn players have been named to the All-Rookie Team, including five of the school's six Rookies of the Year (Taurasi's rookie season predated the 2005 establishment of the All-Rookie Team). Fourteen Huskies alumni have been part of WNBA championship teams, and three have been named WNBA Finals MVP: Maya Moore in 2013, Diana Taurasi in 2009 and 2014 and Breanna Stewart in 2018 and 2020.  The current all time leader of assists in the WNBA is Sue Bird (drafted 1st in 2002) and the current all time scoring leader is Diana Taurasi (drafted first in 2004).

Player selection

Allocations

Regular draft

Notes

References
General

Specific

External links

 UConn Huskies official website
 WNBA official website

Connecticut
UConn Huskies WNBA draft